Adalgisa is a feminine given name of Germanic origins. It may refer to:
Adalgisa Nery (1905–1980), Brazilian poet
Adalgisa Magno Guterres (born 1975), East Timorese politician

See also
Adelchis (given name), the masculine form of the name

Germanic feminine given names
Portuguese feminine given names
Feminine given names